In a sports league, the ranking of a team is the place where it is within the division. Generally, ranking is based on won-lost record of games, with the team with the best record at the top, and the worst record at the bottom. Another common method is a points-based ranking system, where a team is awarded a certain number of points per win, fewer points per tie, and none for a loss.

In most sports, with association football generally being an exception, teams with the better records are awarded the advantage of playing in the postseason and all the glory that accompanies this privilege.

In leagues that use promotion and relegation, being in or near last place typically results in relegation to the next-lower league, although in some leagues, teams that finish near but not at the bottom may enter a promotion/relegation playoff with one or more teams from the next-lower league, and some other leagues relegate teams based on performance over multiple seasons. In leagues with franchise systems, such as those in the US and Canada and in Australia, being in last place is only harmful to the team's reputation and not its place in the league. However, in some franchised leagues, the last place finisher may receive special compensation, such as being offered the first draft choice.

By sport

Association football
Most association football leagues do not directly use teams' won-drawn-lost record to determine ranking. Instead, a points system is used: 3 points for a win, 1 point for a draw and 0 points for a loss.

This system is also used in group stages of major international competitions (such as the FIFA World Cup) and international club competitions (such as the UEFA Champions League and Copa Libertadores).
All competitions also have a tiebreaking procedure to separate teams that are level on points.

Most leagues determine their champions solely by regular-season standings. The most notable exceptions to this rule are leagues in North America and Australia. The top leagues in both regions—Major League Soccer (MLS) in the United States and Canada, Liga MX in Mexico, and the A-League in Australia (plus one team in New Zealand)—operate playoff systems to determine the season champion (or, in Mexico, two season champions). MLS and the A-League are franchised, while Liga MX uses promotion and relegation.

As a general rule, teams that finish sufficiently high on the regular-season table also earn the right to play in the next edition of one of the international club competitions for their region. For example, European clubs (more precisely, clubs in areas governed by UEFA, which includes several countries that lie partially or totally outside geographic Europe) can qualify for the UEFA Champions League, UEFA Europa League, or UEFA Europa Conference League. Similarly, top teams in other parts of the world can qualify for the Copa Libertadores, AFC Champions League, CAF Champions League, CONCACAF Champions League, or OFC Champions League.

Cricket
In most T20 cricket leagues, the top four teams from the group stage advance to the playoffs, which are held under the Page playoff format. 

Initially in the Indian Premier League, there were 52 matches in each league. This was increased to 96 matches in 2011. The top three teams in this league used to automatically make it to the now-defunct Champions League Twenty20, held by International Cricket Council every year.

Baseball
In Major League Baseball, there are three divisions in each league. The leader in each division automatically makes the playoffs, regardless of record. As of 2012, two additional teams, known as the wild cards, play one game to determine who will face the division winner with the best record. From 1995 to 2011, a single wild card team reached the playoffs; before 1969 one team from each league reached the World Series, and from 1969 to 1993 each league had two divisions, whose leaders played a series to determine the league champion and entrant in the World Series. The 1994 season was played using a three-division, one-wild-card setup, but a labor dispute ended the season before these honors could be earned by any team (the first time in 90 years the United States would be without a World Series).

In the Division Series, the team with the best record of the three plays the wild card survivor, and the other two teams play each other in a best-of-five playoff. Beginning with the 2012 postseason, the team with the best record plays the wild-card survivor, regardless of divisional alignment. Previously, teams from the same division were not allowed to meet in the Division Series. The winners of each series play each other in a League Championship Series in a best-of-seven playoff to determine the pennant winner. The two pennant winners then play a best-of-seven series known as the World Series to determine the champion.

Basketball and Hockey
In the NBA and NHL, finishing in last place does not guarantee the first draft choice. Rather, a lottery is used between all of the lower-ranking teams (The 14 out of 30 that failed to reach the postseason).  The team with the worst record is given the highest odds of winning the lottery (often 4-to-1), but is not guaranteed the first choice.  In the NBA, the first three draft choices are chosen via the lottery, and each winning team receives the draft place it won in the lottery.  In the NHL, only one lottery winner is chosen, and if the team is not one of the four worst teams record-wise in the league, it improves four positions in the draft.  If the team is one of the worst four, it receives the first draft choice.  In both leagues, the remaining teams are sorted by their records during the regular season (lottery teams) or playoff performance.  The lottery only affects the first round of the draft.  This format is used to prevent a team from losing intentionally in order to automatically gain the first draft choice privilege.

American football
In the NFL, there are two conferences—the AFC and NFC—which are each divided into four divisions—North, South, East, and West.  The winner of each division plus three "wild card" teams from each conference advance to the playoffs.  The team with the best record in each conference receives a bye in the first round of the playoffs, known as the Wild Card Round, and automatically advances to the Divisional Round (second round).  The six other teams play single-elimination games; the lowest seed of the three winners advances to play the bye team, while the other two Wild Card Round winners play one another.  The Divisional Round winners advance to the conference championship games and then to the Super Bowl, where the winner receives the Lombardi Trophy and title of Super Bowl Champion, along with championship rings for each member.  The NFL Draft is held every April and the order of selection is based on the records from the 16-game regular season, from worst to best, with the Super Bowl champions selecting last.  Trading rules are the same as in basketball and hockey, and trading the rights of players after they have been drafted but before they have signed a contract is not uncommon.

Rugby union
As with association football, most leagues in rugby union use a points system to determine ranking. The most commonly used system in the sport is:
 Base points:  Win: 4, Draw: 2, Loss: 0
 Bonus points:
 1 point for scoring 4 or more tries. In France's professional league, the try bonus is awarded to a team that scores at least 3 more tries than its opponent. 
 1 point for losing by 7 points or less (the value of a converted try)

This system is used in the group stages of all competitions operated by World Rugby, such as the Rugby World Cup. It is also used in group stages of most international club competitions, including the Heineken Cup.

While The Rugby Championship in the Southern Hemisphere has always used the standard bonus points system, its Northern Hemisphere counterpart, the Six Nations Championship, did not use said system until 2017. It instead used a system with no bonus points:  Win: 2 points, Draw: 1 point,  Loss: 0 points. When the Six Nations adopted the standard bonus points system, it added a provision that a team that completes the Grand Slam by defeating all other opponents receives 3 extra table points. This ensures that a Grand Slam winner will win the championship regardless of bonus points earned by any other teams. All competitions also have a tiebreaking procedure to separate teams that are level on points.

Unlike most association football leagues, rugby union leagues generally determine their champions in a knockout playoff. The most common system is a four-team Shaughnessy playoff, though France's Top 14 has a six-team playoff.

See also
Elimination from possibility of reaching postseason

Footnotes

References

Terminology used in multiple sports